Garwood Lake is a lake in Berrien County, in the U.S. state of Michigan.

Garwood Lake was named after Samuel H. Garwood, a pioneer who settled in 1834 near the lake.

References

Lakes of Berrien County, Michigan